Microchannel can refer to
 Basic structure used in microtechnology, see Microchannel (microtechnology).
 Micro Channel architecture in computing